Willem den Toom (11 July 1911 – 13 December 1998) was a Dutch politician of the People's Party for Freedom and Democracy (VVD).

Decorations

References

External links

Official
  W. (Willem) den Toom Parlement & Politiek

 

 
 

1911 births
1998 deaths
Commanders of the Order of Orange-Nassau
Dutch corporate directors
Dutch humanitarians
Dutch lobbyists
Dutch magazine editors
Dutch military writers
Dutch nonprofit directors
Dutch nonprofit executives
Dutch political commentators
Dutch political philosophers
Dutch people of World War II
Dutch prisoners of war in World War II
Dutch veterans' rights activists
Foreign policy writers
Graduates of the Koninklijke Militaire Academie
Knights of the Order of the Netherlands Lion
Ministers of Defence of the Netherlands
People from Amersfoort
Politicians from Rotterdam
People's Party for Freedom and Democracy politicians
Royal Netherlands Army officers
Royal Netherlands Army personnel of World War II
Royal Netherlands Air Force generals
Royal Netherlands Air Force officers
Royal Netherlands Air Force personnel of World War II
State Secretaries for Defence of the Netherlands
World War II prisoners of war held by Germany
20th-century Dutch male writers
20th-century Dutch politicians